Joseph Wilfred Abruquah (1921 – 6 November 1997) was a Ghanaian novelist and educationist.

Early life and education 
Abruquah was born in 1921 in the Gold Coast. He had his secondary education at Mfantsipim School and his tertiary education at King's College London. He obtained a diploma in Education from Westminster College, London.

Career 
Upon his return to the Gold Coast, Abruquah taught at Keta Secondary School. He later succeeded Nathan Quao as Headmaster of the school in 1957. Abruquah held this post until 1963 when he moved to his alma mater Mfantsipim School to serve as the school's Headmaster. Abruquah served as Headmaster of the school until 1972.

Abruquah's first literary publication was; The Catechist, an autobiography believed to have highlighted the ill-treatment meted to his father by the missionaries his father served. Abruquah followed this up with another novel entitled The Torrent. It is alleged that Abruquah was working on a third novel when he was relieved of his duties as Headmaster of Mfantsipim School. He consequently lost all interest in writing fictional novels.

Death 
Abruquah died on 6 November 1997, at the age of 76.

Works 
 The Catechist. G. Allen & Unwin, 1965.
 The Torrent. Longmans, 1968.

See also 
 List of Ghanaian writers

References 

1921 births
1997 deaths
Alumni of King's College London
Ghanaian novelists
Ghanaian schoolteachers
Heads of schools in Ghana
Ghanaian expatriates in the United Kingdom